Jawahar Navodaya Vidyalaya Nizamabad known as JNV Nizamabad or JNV Nizamsagar is an Indian school for talented children and form a part of the system of gifted education. Its significance lies in the selection of talented rural children as the target group and the attempt to provide them with quality education comparable to the best in a residential school system, without regard to their family's socio-economic condition.

It is located Nizamsagar village. The admission process includes an All India Entrance Exam, held at district level.

Objectives
To serve the objectives of excellence coupled with equity and social justice.
To promote national integration by providing opportunities to talented children, largely rural, from different part of the country, to live and learn together and develop their full potential.
To provide good quality modern education, including a strong component of culture, inculcation of values, awareness of the environment, adventure activities and physical education.
To serve, in each district, as focal point for  improvement in quality of school education through sharing of experiences and facilities.

Admission
There is a simple entrance test organised by Jawahar Navodaya Vidyalaya Samiti every year in the month of February.  This test contains
reasoning, math and Hindi.  The entrance form is available on every 'Navodaya Vidyalaya' free of cost mostly in month of October.  Before filling the form the student must be studying in 5th std in a school affiliated by central or state government.
There is also a lateral exam for students who want to join JNVs from 9th std, the students must be studying in 8th std to take the entrance exam which is similar to that of 6th exam but with syllabus of 8th.

Migration
One of the important features of the Navodaya Vidyalaya Scheme is a scheme of exchange of students from one vidyalaya in a particular linguistic region to another in a different linguistic region to promote understanding of the diversity and plurality of India's culture and its people. The aim of the migration in Jawahar Navodaya Vidyalayas is focused on national integration. According to the scheme, selected 30% of 9th class students are exchanged between JNVs of non-Hindi speaking region and Hindi speaking region, for one year.

As part of this JNV Nizamabad exchanges 9th class students with JNV Mathura School of Mathura District, Uttar Pradesh

References

External links
 NVS Official Website
 All India Navodaya Alumni Association Official Website
 JNV Faridabad Official Website
 An independent blog

Jawahar Navodaya Vidyalayas in Telangana
Schools in Telangana
Educational institutions in India with year of establishment missing